Busse House, also known as the Visiting Nurse Association, is a historic home located in downtown Evansville, Indiana.  It was designed by the architectural firm Harris & Shopbell and built in 1901 for a prominent local physician.  It is a -story, Queen Anne style limestone dwelling. It is located next to the Cadick Apartments.

It was listed on the National Register of Historic Places in 1982.

References

Houses on the National Register of Historic Places in Indiana
Queen Anne architecture in Indiana
Houses completed in 1901
National Register of Historic Places in Evansville, Indiana
Houses in Evansville, Indiana